Rebecca Lee Crumpler, born Rebecca Davis, (February 8, 1831March 9, 1895), was an American physician, nurse and author. After studying at the New England Female Medical College, in 1864 she became the first African-American woman to become a doctor of medicine in the United States. Crumpler was one of the first female physician authors in the nineteenth century. In 1883, she published A Book of Medical Discourses. The book has two parts that cover the prevention and cure of infantile bowel complaints, and the life and growth of human beings. Dedicated to nurses and mothers, it focuses on maternal and pediatric medical care and was among the first publications written by an African American about medicine. 
 
Crumpler graduated from medical college at a time when very few African Americans were allowed to attend medical college or publish books. Crumpler first practiced medicine in Boston, primarily serving poor women and children. After the American Civil War ended in 1865, she moved to Richmond, Virginia, believing treating women and children was an ideal way to perform missionary work. Crumpler worked for the Freedmen's Bureau to provide medical care for freed slaves.

She was subject to "intense racism" and sexism while practicing medicine. During this time, many men believed that a nearly immutable difference in average brain size between men and women explained the difference in social, political, and intellectual attainment. Because of this, many male physicians did not respect Rebecca Lee Crumpler, and would not approve her prescriptions for patients or listen to her medical opinions. Still, Rebecca Lee Crumpler persevered and worked passionately.

She later moved back to Boston to continue to treat women and children. The Rebecca Lee Pre-Health Society at Syracuse University and the Rebecca Lee Society, one of the first medical societies for African-American women, were named after her. Her Joy Street house is a stop on the Boston Women's Heritage Trail.

Early life and education
In 1831, Rebecca Lee Crumpler was born Rebecca Davis in Christiana, Delaware to Matilda Webber and Absolum Davis. She was raised in Pennsylvania by her aunt who cared for ill townspeople. Her aunt acted as the doctor in her community and had a huge influence on her. She was inspired by her aunt after seeing that she was the one to go to when people got sick. She moved to Charlestown, Massachusetts, in 1852, where she worked as a nurse before applying and becoming accepted into the New England Female Medical College. Rebecca Lee Crumpler was the only African American woman who attended this school at this time.

Education

Nursing and medical school
From 1855 to 1864, Crumpler was employed as a nurse. She was accepted into the New England Female Medical College in 1860. This school was founded in 1848 by Samuel Gregory. She won a tuition award from the Wade Scholarship Fund, established by a bequest from local businessman John Wade of Woburn.

It was rare for women or black men to be admitted to medical schools during this time. In 1860, due to the heavy demands of medical care for Civil War veterans, there were more opportunities for women physicians and doctors. Due to her talent, Crumpler was given a recommendation to attend the school by her supervising physician when she was a medical apprentice. That year, there were 54,543 physicians in the United States, 300 of whom were women. None of them were African Americans, making Rebecca Lee Crumpler the first and only African American physician in her class.

Crumpler graduated from New England Female Medical College in 1864 after having completed three years of coursework, a thesis, and final oral examinations in February 1864. On March 1, 1864, the board of trustees named her a Doctor of Medicine. Married to Wyatt Lee at that time, she was identified as Mrs. Rebecca Lee by the school, where she was the only African American graduate. She was the country's first African-American woman to become a formally-trained physician.

Physician
Crumpler first practiced medicine in Boston. She primarily cared for poor African-American women and children. After the end of the American Civil War (1861–1865), she moved to Richmond, Virginia, believing it to be an ideal way to provide missionary service, as well as to gain more experience learning about diseases that affected women and children. She said of that time, "During my stay there nearly every hour was improved in that sphere of labor. The last quarter of the year 1866, I was enabled... to have access each day to a very large number of the indigent, and others of different classes, in a population of over 30,000 colored."

Crumpler worked for the Freedmen's Bureau to provide medical care to freed slaves who were denied care by white physicians. At the Freedmen's Bureau she worked under the assistant commissioner, Orlando Brown. Subject to intense racism by both the administration and other physicians, she had difficulty getting prescriptions filled and was ignored by male physicians. Some people heckled that the M.D. behind her name stood for "Mule Driver".Rebecca knew being the first African American woman in this field would be challenging, but she was resilient and overcame this adversity.

Crumpler moved to 67 Joy Street in Boston, a predominantly African-American community street in Beacon Hill. She practiced medicine and treated children without much concern for the parents' ability to pay. Her house is on the Boston Women's Heritage Trail.

Education

In 1860, bearing letters of recommendation from her physician-employers, Crumpler was accepted into the elite West Newton English and Classical School in Massachusetts, where she was a "special student in mathematics". Crumpler taught in Wilmington beginning in 1874 and in New Castle, Delaware beginning in 1876.

A Book of Medical Discourses
In 1883, Crumpler published A Book of Medical Discourses from the notes she kept over the course of her medical career. Dedicated to nurses and mothers, it focused on the medical care of women and children. Her main desire in presenting this book was to emphasize the "possibilities of prevention". Therefore, she recommended that women should study the mechanisms of human structure before becoming a nurse in order to better enable themselves to protect life. However, Crumpler stated that most nurses did not agree with this and tended to forget that for every ailment, there was a cause and it was within their power to remove it. Although her primary focus was on the health of women and children, which seemed to be influenced by homeopathy, Crumpler recommended courses of treatment without stating that the treatment was homeopathic. She did not mention that medicine could be harmful, but stated the conventional amount of standard medicine usage. Her medical book is divided into two sections:  in the first part she focuses on preventing and mitigating intestinal problems that can occur around the teething period until the child is about five years of age; the second part mainly focused on the following areas: "life and growth of beings", the beginning of womanhood and the prevention and cure of most of the "distressing complaints" of both sexes. Although the book was focussed on medical advice, Crumpler also ties in autobiographical details that contain political, social, and moral commentary. Specifically in the first chapter, Crumpler gave non-medical advice concerning her thoughts on what age and how a woman should enter into marriage. The chapter also contained advice for both men and women on how to ensure a happy marriage. Crumpler describes the progression of experiences that led her to study and practice medicine in her book:
It may be well to state here that, having been reared by a kind aunt in Pennsylvania, whose usefulness with the sick was continually sought, I early conceived a liking for, and sought every opportunity to relieve the sufferings of others. Later in life I devoted my time, when best I could, to nursing as a business, serving under different doctors for a period of eight years; most of the time at my adopted home in Charlestown, Middlesex County, Massachusetts. From these doctors I received letters commending me to the faculty of the New England Female Medical College, whence, four years afterward, I received the degree of Doctress of Medicine. At the time, writings and books by African-American authors had prefaces and introductions written in the style of white male writings to give them authentication. Crumpler was able to introduce her own text, and was also able to justify her work based on her own authority.

Personal life
While living in Charlestown, Rebecca Davis married Wyatt Lee, a Virginia native who was formerly enslaved. They were married on April 19, 1852,. This was Wyatt's second, and her first, marriage. A year later Wyatt's son, Albert, died at age 7. This tragedy may have motivated Rebecca to begin her study of nursing for the next eight years. Rebecca was still a medical student when her husband died of tuberculosis on April 18, 1863. He is buried at Mount Hope Cemetery in Boston.

Dr. Rebecca Lee married Arthur Crumpler in Saint John, New Brunswick on May 24, 1865. Arthur was formerly enslaved and escaped bondage from Southampton County, Virginia. Born in 1824, he was the son of Samuel Crumpler, who was enslaved by Benjamin Crumpler. Arthur lived on the neighboring estate of a large landowner, Robert Adams, with his mother and siblings. When Adams died, his family was sold and nine-year-old Arthur was kept by Robert Adams' son, John Adams of Smithfield, Virginia after Arthur won a wrestling contest with John on the day of the estate auction. Except for one sister, he never found out the whereabouts of the people who continued enslaving and "purchased" his family members. He served with the Union Army at Fort Monroe, Virginia as a blacksmith, based upon his training and experience. He went to Massachusetts in 1862 and was taken in by Nathaniel Allen, founder of the West Newton English and Classical School, called the Allen School. On July 16, 2020, a ceremony was held at the Fairview Cemetery to dedicate a gravestone in memory of Rebecca Lee Crumpler and her husband Arthur. The granite stone was the result of a fundraising appeal spearheaded by Vicky Gall, a history buff and president of the Friends of the Hyde Park Library.

The couple were active members of the Twelfth Baptist Church where Arthur was a trustee. They had a home at 20 Garden Street in Boston. Their daughter Lizzie Sinclair Crumpler was born in mid-December 1870, but as no other records have been found, it is believed the child did not survive infancy. For instance, Crumpler and her husband Arthur lived in Hyde Park, Massachusetts in 1880, but they did not have a child living with them at that time.

Crumpler spoke at a service for Massachusetts Senator Charles Sumner upon his death in 1874. She read a poem that she had written for him, where "she touchingly alluded to his love for the gifted Emerson". By 1880, the Crumplers moved to Hyde Park, Boston.

Although no photographs or other images of Crumpler survive, a Boston Globe article described her as "a very pleasant and intellectual woman and an indefatigable church worker. Dr. Crumpler is 59 or 60 years of age, tall and straight, with light brown skin and gray hair." About marriage, she said the secret to a successful marriage "is to continue in the careful routine of the courting days, till it becomes well understood between the two".

Rebecca Crumpler died on March 9, 1895, in Fairview, Massachusetts, while still residing in Hyde Park. Arthur died in May, 1910, and they are both buried at the nearby Fairview Cemetery.  She and her husband were buried in unmarked graves for 125 years, until July 16, 2020, when Rebecca Lee Crumpler and her husband Arthur Crumpler received granite headstones for their gravesite from donations. A ceremony was held at Fairview Cemetery, as a gravestone finally was installed.

Legacy
The Rebecca Lee Society, one of the first medical societies for African-American women, was named in her honor. Her home on Joy Street is a stop on the Boston Women's Heritage Trail.

In 2019, Virginia Governor Ralph Northam declared March 30 (National Doctors Day) the Dr. Rebecca Lee Crumpler Day.

At Syracuse University there is a pre-health club named "The Rebecca Lee Pre-Health Society". This club encourages people of diverse backgrounds to pursue health professions. They offer mentors, workshops, and resources to help members succeed.

See also

 List of African-American firsts
 List of Boston University people
 List of people from Delaware
 List of people from Pennsylvania
 List of people from Virginia
 List of physicians
 Lists of writers

Notes

References

Further reading
 "Female Medical College of 100 Years Ago Had Two Professors and Not Even a Skeleton", O'Brien, Mary; Daily Boston Globe (1928–1960); October 21, 1948; p. 20.

External links
 Rebecca Lee Crumpler, First African American Woman Doctor
 

1831 births
1895 deaths
People from New Castle County, Delaware
Writers from Boston
Writers from Delaware
Writers from Pennsylvania
People from Charlestown, Boston
Writers from Richmond, Virginia
People of the Reconstruction Era
Physicians from Massachusetts
Physicians from Pennsylvania
Physicians from Virginia
Boston University alumni
19th-century American writers
19th-century American women writers
African-American non-fiction writers
American non-fiction writers
African-American physicians
American primary care physicians
African-American women writers
African-American writers
American medical writers
Women medical writers
People from Beacon Hill, Boston
American women non-fiction writers
19th-century American women physicians
19th-century American physicians
People from Hyde Park, Boston
African-American women physicians